Jennifer Teege (born 29 June 1970) is a German writer. Her maternal grandfather was German Nazi concentration camp commander and war criminal Amon Göth. Her 2015 book My Grandfather Would Have Shot Me: A Black Woman Discovers Her Family's Nazi Past was a New York Times bestseller.

Life
Teege, who was born Jennifer Göth to a Nigerian father and an Austrian-German mother, grew up in foster care. She was adopted at the age of seven. Teege studied at the Sorbonne, and learned Hebrew in Israel where she studied for five years.

At the age of 38, Teege unexpectedly found out about her family history, by picking up a book in a Hamburg library that happened to be her mother Monika Hertwig's biography and where she discovered that Amon Göth was her grandfather, which caused her to plunge into a severe depression. She decided to combat her depression and come to terms with this revelation by writing her book My Grandfather Would Have Shot Me. Her book was a success and became a New York Times bestseller. Translations of the book, which was originally published in Teege's native language, German, have been made into Danish, English, French, Hebrew, Hungarian, Italian, Dutch, Polish, Portuguese and Spanish.

Works
 Jennifer Teege, Nikola Sellmair: Amon. Mein Großvater hätte mich erschossen. Rowohlt, Reinbek bei Hamburg, 2013, .
English edition:

See also
Afro-Germans, the ethnic group which Teege is a part of.

References

External links
Neo-Griot interview with Jennifer Teege, author of ‘My grandfather would have shot me’.
 Q&A with Jennifer Teege (August 12, 2015), Jennifer Teege talked about her book.
Jennifer Teege, granddaughter of a Nazi war criminal – interview at Deutsche Welle English (video, 29 mins)

1970 births
Living people
Writers from Munich
German people of Austrian descent
German people of Nigerian descent
German women writers
German expatriates in France
German expatriates in Israel
Amon Göth